George Martin Kelly (born 12 November 1996) is an Irish association football player who plays as a forward for EFL Championship club Rotherham United.

Career

UCD
Kelly joined UCD after a brief stint with Derry City. In 2017, Kelly scored a hat-trick against, Athlone Town, securing the top scorer title for the season.

Dundalk
After two and a half seasons in the First Division, Kelly signed with Premier Division club, Dundalk. He played his first European match against Estonian side, FCI Levadia Tallinn in the 2018–19 UEFA Europa League qualifying rounds.   He ended the 2018 season with the rare double of First Division (for UCD) and Premier Division (for Dundalk) winner's medals, and also won the FAI Cup.

During the 2019 season, Kelly and Dundalk narrowly missed out on the treble, following a penalty shootout in the 2019 FAI Cup Final against Shamrock Rovers.

Loan to St Patrick's Athletic
Kelly was loaned to St Patrick's Athletic for the remainder of the 2020 season on 28 July 2020. On 7 August 2020, he scored his first goals for the club, netting a brace as his side beat Finn Harps 2–0 at Richmond Park. His only other goal for the club came in a 3–2 loss away to Finn Harps on 29 October 2020.

Bohemians
On 22 December 2020, Kelly signed for Bohemians for the 2021 season. Kelly scored his first Premier Division hat-trick in a 5–1 victory against Dundalk. Following a successful first season at the club, Kelly was the league's top scorer with 21 goals including a late equaliser against Sligo Rovers in the final game of the season. He was later named to the team of the year. He helped the club reach the 2021 FAI Cup Final where they eventually lost to his former club, St Patrick's Athletic.

Rotherham United
In January 2022 he signed for EFL League One club Rotherham United. On 30 April 2022, Kelly scored the second goal in a 2–0 win for Rotherham over Gillingham which secured promotion to the Championship, having come on as a substitute 10 minutes beforehand to make his first team debut.

Career statistics

Honours

Club
Dundalk
League of Ireland Premier Division (2): 2018, 2019
FAI Cup (1): 2018
League of Ireland Cup (1): 2019
Champions Cup (1): 2019

Rotherham United
EFL Trophy (1): 2021–22

Individual
PFAI Players' Player of the Year (1): 2021
FAI League Player of the Year (1): 2021
League of Ireland Premier Division Top Scorer (1): 2021
League of Ireland First Division Top Scorer (1): 2017

References

1996 births
Living people
Republic of Ireland association footballers
Association football forwards
Derry City F.C. players
University College Dublin A.F.C. players
Dundalk F.C. players
St Patrick's Athletic F.C. players
Bohemian F.C. players
League of Ireland players
Rotherham United F.C. players
Association footballers from County Donegal
People from County Donegal
English Football League players